Ragnar Sohlman (February 26, 1870 – July 9, 1948) was a Swedish chemical engineer, manager, civil servant, and creator of the Nobel Foundation.

Biography 
Ragnar Sohlman was born in Stockholm to August Sohlman, a well-known newspaper man, and his wife Hulda Maria Sandeberg. In 1887, he enrolled at the KTH Royal Institute of Technology in Stockholm and graduated as a chemical engineer in 1890.

In 1893 Sohlman became the assistant of Alfred Nobel in San Remo, and Nobel's will from 1895 named him and Rudolf Lilljequist as executors, with Sohlman expected to do most of the work. The will stated:

The sum of 100,000 crowns was a very significant amount at the time, and made Sohlman a wealthy man. The amount can be compared to the prize amount of the first Nobel Prizes in 1901, 150,782 crowns each.

After Alfred Nobel's death on December 10, 1896, Sohlman was occupied for several years with the task of realizing Nobel's intentions of establishing the Nobel Prize. Since the will did not contain detailed regulations regarding selection of laureates and was contested by Nobel's relatives, the task kept Sohlman and his advisors occupied for several years. Sohlman was a member of the interim board of the Nobel Foundation.

Sohlman also had a career as engineer and manager in Nobel-related companies, such as Bofors. He was also the director general of the Swedish National Board of Trade 1935–1936.

He was the executive director of the Nobel Foundation 1929–1946.

In 1940, he was awarded the Illis quorum.

Sohlman died at the Karolinska hospital in Solna in 1948.

Solhman's son was a Swedish diplomat and his grandson Michael Sohlman is the present executive director of the Nobel Foundation.

References 

1870 births
1948 deaths
Nobel Prize
20th-century Swedish engineers
Swedish chemical engineers
20th-century Swedish businesspeople
Engineers from Stockholm
Recipients of the Illis quorum